Mount Morton is a mountain standing between Blériot Glacier and Cayley Glacier on the west coast of Graham Land, Antarctica. It was photographed by the Falkland Islands and Dependencies Aerial Survey Expedition in 1956–57, and mapped from these photos by the Falkland Islands Dependencies Survey. The mountain was named by the UK Antarctic Place-Names Committee in 1960 for Grant Morton, an American aviator who made the first parachute descent from an airplane using a parachute carried loosely.

References

Mountains of Graham Land
Danco Coast